The Fairfax Assembly & Stamping is a General Motors automobile factory at 3201 Fairfax Trafficway, Kansas City, Kansas in the United States. As of 2022, the  plant employs over 2,100 hourly and salaried employees.  Employees are represented by UAW Local 31.

History

Fairfax 
The original Fairfax assembly plant was located next to Fairfax Airport which was the former location of the North American Bomber Production Plant where the B-25 Mitchell was manufactured during World War II.  After the war GM purchased the building and converted it to an automobile assembly plant, and was under the management of GM's newly created Buick-Oldsmobile-Pontiac Assembly Division created in 1945. In 1952, alongside car production, the plant produced F-84F jet-powered fighters.

Fairfax II

The original Fairfax plant ceased production in 1986, and production was moved to Fairfax II.  Fairfax II is located on the former Fairfax airport in a $1 billion project. The new plant began production with the 1988 model Pontiac Grand Prix.  In 2003, production of the Chevrolet Malibu was added.  On August 23, 2005, the Fairfax facility built its 10 millionth car.

Production of the second generation Buick LaCrosse began at the plant in 2009 and continued through 2016.  In January 2013, GM announced $600 million in upgrades to the plant including a new 450,000-square-foot paint shop and a new stamping press.  The renovations, which were aimed at reducing water consumption and chemical waste, were not expected to interfere with production.  In 2019, the all-new Cadillac XT4 was added.

Vehicles produced 
as of September, 2022:
 Cadillac XT4
 Chevrolet Malibu

References

External links
 

General Motors factories
Motor vehicle assembly plants in Kansas
Buildings and structures in Kansas City, Kansas
Industrial buildings completed in 1987
1987 establishments in Kansas
1980s architecture in the United States